Franco Cángele (born 16 July 1984 in Francisco Madero, Buenos Aires) is an Argentine footballer, who played as a forward.

Cángele went through the Boca Juniors youth system to make his debut for the club in 2002, he played a total of 57 games for the club in all competitions, scoring 10 goals. Cángele won three trophies in his time at Boca; the Primera Division Argentina Apertura 2003, the Copa Libertadores 2003 and the Copa Sudamericana 2004.

In 2005 Cángele was transferred to Club Atlético Independiente and then later that year to Colón de Santa Fe. In 2006 and fellow Colón team mate Alejandro Capurro signed contracts with Sakaryaspor in Turkey.

In 2013 Cángele left Turkey for a personal problem, and after a few months training with the first team of Boca Juniors. He confirm the return to the first team this season. 
The day 27 of June 2013 Franco, in dialogue with Argentinian Radio La Red on Buenos Aires declare  "I am a Boca Juniors player again. I just know about it," declare the midfield of 28 years. As well he added:"I can play as a winger or as a second striker," he predicted, excited for the chance to back to the first team of Boca Juniors.

Honours

International career

He came to international attention playing for the Argentina Under-20 team in the 2003 FIFA World Youth Championship in which Argentina finished fourth overall.

Honours
Kayserispor
Turkish Cup (1): 2007–08

References

External links
 Statistics at Guardian StatsCentre
 

1984 births
Living people
Sportspeople from Buenos Aires Province
Argentine footballers
Argentina under-20 international footballers
Argentine expatriate footballers
Association football forwards
Boca Juniors footballers
Boca Unidos footballers
Club Atlético Independiente footballers
Club Atlético Colón footballers
Sakaryaspor footballers
Kayserispor footballers
Expatriate footballers in Turkey
Argentine Primera División players
Primera Nacional players
Süper Lig players
TFF First League players
Argentine expatriate sportspeople in Turkey
Pan American Games gold medalists for Argentina
Pan American Games medalists in football
Footballers at the 2003 Pan American Games
Medalists at the 2003 Pan American Games